José Diogo Castro Ferradeira dos Santos (born 9 February 1994), known as Zé Diogo, is a Portuguese footballer who plays for Merelinense F.C. as a winger.

Club career
Born in Póvoa de Varzim, Zé Diogo developed as a footballer at hometown club Varzim S.C. from the age of 8. He made his professional debut on 21 May 2011 towards the end of a season in which his team were relegated from the Liga de Honra, playing the final ten minutes of a 2–1 home loss against C.F. Os Belenenses as a substitute for Tiago Carneiro. He returned to youth football in January 2013, down the road at Rio Ave FC.

Zé Diogo spent the next few seasons in the third division in service of F.C. Tirsense, SC Vianense, AD Fafe and Merelinense FC. On 11 July 2019, he returned to second-tier Varzim on a two-year deal. Having played just five minutes, he was released in June 2020.

References

External links

1994 births
Living people
People from Póvoa de Varzim
Portuguese footballers
Association football wingers
Liga Portugal 2 players
Campeonato de Portugal (league) players
Varzim S.C. players
F.C. Tirsense players
SC Vianense players
AD Fafe players
Merelinense F.C. players
Sportspeople from Porto District